The 1996 BPR 4 Hours of Le Castellet was the first race of the 1996 BPR Global GT Series.  It was run at the Circuit Paul Ricard on 3 March 1996.

Official results
Class winners in bold.  Cars failing to complete 75% of winner's distance marked as Not Classified (NC).

Statistics
 Pole Position - #2 Gulf Racing - 1:53.915
 Fastest Lap - #27 Ennea Igol - 1:52.653

External links
 Race Results

Le Castellet
Le Castellet